Rhodopina blairi is a species of beetle in the family Cerambycidae. It was described by Gressitt in 1937. It is known from China.

References

blairi
Beetles described in 1937